Carlos de la Cruz Ayala Vargas (born April 2, 1980 in Esplugues de Llobregat) is a Spanish politician, co-founder of the Spanish Pirate Party, and was leader of the party from its foundation in 2006 until September 2010. Ayala studied at the Charles III University of Madrid, and lives in Ulea, Murcia.

External links 
 Estamos en contra del top manta (Spanish), interview of Carlos Ayala Vargas

References 

People from Esplugues de Llobregat
1980 births
Living people
Pirate Party (Spain) politicians
Charles III University of Madrid alumni